Abakumovka is a rural locality (a village) in Novonikolayevsky Selsovet of Ilansky District, Krasnoyarsk Krai, Russia. The population was 6 as of 2010. There is 1 street.

Geography 
Abakumovka is located 63 km south of Ilansky (the district's administrative centre) by road. Roslyaki is the nearest rural locality.

References 

Rural localities in Krasnoyarsk Krai
Ilansky District